Xie Huan (active 1426–1452)  was a Chinese painter of the early Ming Dynasty. He is best known for his painting of domestic settings, story-theme artwork, and landscape paintings.

The famous Chinese painter Shen Zhou admired his artwork, and collected art pieces by Xie Huan.

Gallery

See also

List of Chinese people
List of Chinese painters
Chinese art
Chinese painting

Notes

External links
Metro Museum
Social Status and Art Collecting

References
Barnhart, R. M. et al. (1997). Three thousand years of Chinese painting. New Haven, Yale University Press. 

Ming dynasty painters
Year of death unknown
Artists from Wenzhou
Painters from Zhejiang
Year of birth unknown